Chimalhuacán (Nahuatl for "place of those who have shields") is a city and municipality located in the eastern part of State of Mexico, Mexico. It lies just outside the northeast border of Mexico City and is part of the Greater Mexico City urban area.

The city
The city is practically coextensive with the municipality. The census of 2005 reported a population of 524,223 for the city and 525,389 for the municipality as a whole.

Chimalhuacán was founded 1259 by three chiefs or tlatoani named Huauxomatl, Chalchiutlatonac and Tlatzcantecuhtli. These chiefs and their people originated from Tula and Culhuacán. They spoke Chichimeca and Mexica languages but with time their customs merged and Náhuatl became the dominant language. It became subject to Texcoco, and through that belonged to the Aztec Triple Alliance in 1431. The Spanish town of Chimalhuacán was founded in 1529 and the Dominicans built a church and monastery here in 1563.

The municipality
Although the city takes up almost all of the municipality, Chimalhuacán, as the municipal seat, has governing jurisdiction over the following communities:  Colonia Nueva de Guadalupe la Palma, La Pista de los Corredores, Pista Aérea, Tlatel San Juan  Xochiaca Parte Alta, and Zapotla.

Chimalhuacan has a new park in the center of the municipality, Plaza Estado de Mexico Chimalhuacan, with a library, theater and other places for entertainment.
The entry of the municipality has a monument to Chimalhucán, called Guerrero Chimalli, a 60-meter tall steel statue.

The municipality has an area of 46.61 km² (17.996 sq mi). The adjacent municipalities are Nezahualcóyotl, Atenco, Texcoco, Chicoloapan, and La Paz. The city is the sixth largest in the state in population (after Ecatepec de Morelos, Nezahualcóyotl, Naucalpan de Juárez, Toluca, and Tlalnepantla de Baz).

"La Degolladora"

During September 2015, a series of attacks on the citizens of Chimalhuacan began.  The attacker was nicknamed "La Degolladora" ("The Decapitator") by local and international press due to the use of knives to injure and kill people randomly.

″Loca Tristeza Mexicana″
Six members of the ″Loca Tristeza Mexicana″ band were arrested in March 2021 for two murders in 2020. Band members were heavily armed and in possession of drugs. They were also implicated in a kidnapping and murder of a local firefighter in 2018.

References

External links
Chimalhuacan, Mexico
Municipio de Chimalhuacán Official website

Populated places in the State of Mexico
Municipalities of the State of Mexico